Flutazolam (Coreminal, MS-4101) is a drug which is a benzodiazepine derivative. It was invented in Japan, and this is the main country in which it has been used medically. It has sedative, muscle relaxant, anticonvulsant, and anxiolytic effects similar to those produced by other benzodiazepine derivatives, and though it is around the same potency as diazepam, it produces a more marked sedation and impaired coordination. It is indicated for the treatment of insomnia. Its major active metabolite is n-desalkylflurazepam, also known as norflurazepam, which is also a principal metabolite of flurazepam (trade name Dalmane). While flutazolam has a very short half-life of only 3.5 hours, n-desalkylflurazepam has a long half-life of between 47–100 hours.

Flutazolam is closely related in structure to another benzodiazepine, haloxazolam.

See also 
Benzodiazepine
Flurazepam
N-desalkylflurazepam

References 

Primary alcohols
Chloroarenes
GABAA receptor positive allosteric modulators
Lactams
Fluoroarenes
Oxazolobenzodiazepines